The 2019 Ultimate Tailgating 200 was a NASCAR Gander Outdoors Truck Series race held on February 23, 2019, at Atlanta Motor Speedway in Hampton, Georgia. Contested over 130 laps on the 1.54-mile-long (2.48 km) asphalt quad-oval intermediate speedway, it was the second race of the 2019 NASCAR Gander Outdoors Truck Series season.

Entry list

Practice

First practice

Final practice

Qualifying
Qualifying was canceled due to rain. Austin Hill was awarded the pole for the race based on 2018 owner's points.

Qualifying results

Race

Stage Results

Stage One
Laps: 40

Stage Two
Laps: 40

Final Stage Results

Stage Three
Laps: 50

References

Ultimate Tailgating
NASCAR races at Atlanta Motor Speedway
Ultimate Tailgating 200